The OnePlus 8T is an Android-based smartphone designed and marketed by OnePlus. It is the sixteenth phone released by OnePlus, and was announced on 14 October 2020, and released on 16 October 2020. A variant of this phone is sold by T-Mobile US as the OnePlus 8T+.

Specifications

Design 
The OnePlus 8T is similar to the OnePlus 8 externally, with an anodized aluminum frame and Gorilla Glass 5 panels. The display has a circular cutout for the front-facing camera. However, it is differentiated by its display glass, which is flat rather than curved. The back panel has a different camera module with a raised rectangular lens, split into two columns. The first contains three of the cameras, while the second contains the depth sensor, color temperature sensor and dual-LED flash. It is available in two finishes, Aquamarine Green (glossy) and Lunar Silver (matte).

Hardware 
The OnePlus 8T is powered by the Snapdragon 865 5G processor with the Adreno 650 GPU, accompanied by 128 or 256 GB of non-expandable UFS 3.1 storage and 8 or 12 GB of LPDDR4X RAM. It has stereo speakers with active noise cancellation, but no audio jack. Biometric options include an optical (in-display) fingerprint scanner and facial recognition.

The display is a 6.55-inch 1080p AMOLED with a 20:9 aspect ratio and HDR10+ support, identical to the 8 aside from the refresh rate, which has been increased from 90 Hz to 120 Hz. The battery capacity is slightly larger than the 8 at 4500 mAh. Fast-charging is supported at up to 65 W via Warp Charge 65 compared to the 8's Warp Charge 30. This is enabled by a dual-cell design, with the battery split into two 2250 mAh cells. Like the OnePlus 8, wireless charging is not supported.

The standard unlocked 8T supports two physical SIM cards, and lacks an IP rating, but it has seals for making the phone waterproof. The T-Mobile US variant has only one SIM slot, but has an IP68 rating.

Camera 
The OnePlus 8T includes a quad camera array, consisting of a 48 MP wide sensor, a 16 MP ultrawide sensor, a 5 MP macro sensor and a 2 MP monochrome sensor. Most of the camera hardware is unchanged from the 8, with the Sony IMX586 carried over for the wide sensor. The front-facing camera has a 16 MP sensor.

Software 
The OnePlus 8T runs on OxygenOS 11, which is based on Android 11. It is the first non-Google phone to ship with Android 11 pre-installed.

Variants 
OnePlus 8T have several variants. The differences are usually with the supported bands and pricing.

Reception 
The OnePlus 8T received positive reviews, receiving an 8.6/10 from CNET, an 8/10 from The Verge,
an 8.4/10 from Engadget, and a 3.5/5 from Digital Trends. The phone was praised for its performance, display, software, battery life, and 65 W charging speeds. However, its camera, while nonetheless commended, was criticized as lacking when compared to other flagship phones, with the macro and monochrome lenses being considered superfluous or gimmicky. The exclusion of an IP rating (except in phones sold by T-Mobile US) and wireless charging were additionally seen as drawbacks.

Reviewers generally felt the OnePlus 8T to be an incremental improvement from the OnePlus 8. The high-end model with 12 GB RAM and 256 GB UFS was criticized as being overpriced; being the only model sold in the US in contrast to other countries, some suggested that potential US buyers should consider other competing phones or those from OnePlus.

OnePlus 9R 
OnePlus re-released 8T as OnePlus 9R as part of the OnePlus 9 series on April 14, 2021. It runs on OxygenOS 11.2.4.4 compared to 11.0.4. It also runs on a new chipset, the Qualcomm Snapdragon 870 5G and a slightly improved Octa-core CPU (1x 3.2 GHz Kryo 585 + 3x 2.42 Kryo 585* + 4x 1.8 GHz Kryo 585) with a new memory option, 256 GB + 8 GB RAM. But it lacks CDMA connection and SBAS. It is available in Lake Blue and Carbon Black for $424.79 (128GB + 8GB RAM option).

It also has another version OnePlus 9RT, released on October 13, 2021, and October 19, 2021, in general availability. The OnePlus 9RT has a larger 6.62" screen compared to vanilla 9 and 9R. It runs on ColorOS 12 with a Qualcomm Snapdragon 888 5G chipset and has CDMA and EVDO connections. It has a 50MP main camera with OIS, 16MP 123˚ ultrawide angle camera and a 2MP macro camera. Some of the specifications stay the same. But however, it runs on AMOLED screen instead of Fluid AMOLED compared to vanilla 9 and 9R. It also lacks monochromatic camera. It is available on Hacker Black, Blue and Nano Silver colors.

(*) The part of CPU stays the same.

References

External links

OnePlus mobile phones
Android (operating system) devices
Mobile phones introduced in 2020
Mobile phones with 4K video recording
Mobile phones with multiple rear cameras